Marcos Antônio Abdalla Leite, also commonly known as Marquinhos Leite (born March 23, 1952) is a retired Brazilian professional basketball player and coach.  He represented the senior Brazilian national basketball team at three Summer Olympics and four FIBA World Cup competitions. At a height of 2.08 m (6'10") tall, he played at the center position.

Early career
Leite, originally from Rio de Janeiro, began playing club basketball with the Brazilian team Fluminense (1967–1974). In addition, he played on loan at E.C. Sírio in some championships between 1971 and 1973.

College career
In 1972, Leite averaged 16 points per game, at the 1972 Munich Summer Olympics. Pepperdine University's American head coach, Gary Colson, recruited Leite to the California school, based on his performance at the Olympics. Leite later went on to play college basketball at the school, where he starred with the Pepperdine Waves, from 1974 to 1976.  He made an immediate impact in the West Coast Athletic Conference, earning All-WCAC Second Team honors as a freshman, and All-WCAC First Team honors as a sophomore.

As a junior, in the 1975–76 season, Leite and junior college transfer Dennis Johnson, led the Waves to a conference title, the school's second Division I NCAA Tournament appearance, and first NCAA Tournament win.  The Waves beat Memphis State, in the first round, before losing to defending national champion UCLA, in the Sweet 16.  Leite was named the WCAC Player of the Year, and an Honorable Mention All-American.  Following the season, Leite informed Colson that he would forgo his final year of college eligibility, in order to play professionally.

During his college career, Leite scored 1,119 points (18.7 points per game), and grabbed 638 rebounds (10.6 per game). He was inducted into Pepperdine's Athletic Hall of Fame in 2013.

Professional career
After college, Leite was drafted by the Portland Trail Blazers, in the 1976 NBA Draft, in the 10th round, with the 162nd overall pick. However, he never played in the NBA.  During his pro career, Leite played club basketball in his native Brazil, with Fluminense, E.C. Sírio, C.R. Flamengo, and E.C. Bradesco. He also played in the Italian League, with Athletic Genova and Virtus Bologna.  He retired in 1989.

National team career
Leite first suited up with Brazil's senior national team at the age of 18, at the 1970 FIBA World Cup.  "Marquinhos" played sparingly during that tournament, as he scored 6 points in 4 games, as Brazil won the tournament's silver medal.  Leite remained on the Brazilian national team, and was one of the team's top players, as they won the gold medal at the 1971 Pan American Games, a year later.

Leite averaged 16 points per game, at the 1972 Munich Summer Olympics. He also represented Brazil at the 1974 FIBA World Cup, and the 1975 Pan American Games.  In later years, he was also a part of Brazil's 1978 and 1982 FIBA World Cup squads, and their 1980 and 1984 Summer Olympics teams.

References

External links
FIBA Profiles
Italian League Profile 
NCAA Stats

1952 births
Living people
Athletic Genova basketball players
Basketball players at the 1971 Pan American Games
Basketball players at the 1972 Summer Olympics
Basketball players at the 1975 Pan American Games
Basketball players at the 1979 Pan American Games
Basketball players at the 1980 Summer Olympics
Basketball players at the 1983 Pan American Games
Basketball players at the 1984 Summer Olympics
Brazilian basketball coaches
Brazilian expatriate basketball people in the United States
Brazilian expatriates in Italy
Brazilian men's basketball players
1970 FIBA World Championship players
1974 FIBA World Championship players
1978 FIBA World Championship players
1982 FIBA World Championship players
Centers (basketball)
Esporte Clube Sírio basketball players
Expatriate basketball people in Italy
Flamengo basketball players
Franca Basquetebol Clube players
Medalists at the 1971 Pan American Games
Medalists at the 1979 Pan American Games
Olympic basketball players of Brazil
Pan American Games bronze medalists for Brazil
Pan American Games gold medalists for Brazil
Pan American Games medalists in basketball
Pan American Games silver medalists for Brazil
Pepperdine Waves men's basketball players
Portland Trail Blazers draft picks
Power forwards (basketball)
Sport Club Corinthians Paulista basketball players
Vila Nova Basquete Clube players
Virtus Bologna players
Basketball players from Rio de Janeiro (city)